Clyde Valley Blackhawks are an American football club based in Wishaw, Scotland.

History
The Clyde Valley Blackhawks were formed as the senior team of the former British champion Clyde Valley Hawks youth football team. The former players wanted to take Clyde Valley football to the next level rather than join another club and thus the Blackhawks were created in 2007. The club's first head coach was David Czekalla former offensive coordinator of the Hawks. The Blackhawks joined the BAFA senior league as affiliates for the 2008 season.

The Blackhawks joined Division 2 of the senior league in 2009 and quickly adjusted to life in the senior league posting a 6–4 record in their first full season. The 2014 season saw the Clyde Valley Blackhawks claim the Division 2 Northern Conference Championship. This was the icing on the cake for the Clyde Valley football program that had never had a losing season since joining the senior league in 2009.
Winning the title the previous year saw the Blackhawks promoted to Division 1 for the first time in 2015.

The Blackhawks withdrew from league football at the start of the 2016 season
After successfully completing three associate games in 2016 the Blackhawks were re-admitted to the National Leagues in 2017.

References

External links
 https://www.facebook.com/clydevalleyblackhawks/

BAFA National League teams
Sport in North Lanarkshire
American football teams in Scotland
2007 establishments in Scotland
American football teams established in 2007
Wishaw